Simpson Ground Reservoir is a reservoir in Cumbria, England, near the southeastern end of Windermere. It is located within a Forestry Commission conifer plantation, to the east of Staveley-in-Cartmel and provides fresh water supply for Grange-Over-Sands and the Haweswater aqueduct to Barrow. A plaque near the bank commemorates the opening of the reservoir on 4 May 1957 by the Lancashire County Council.

References

Reservoirs in Cumbria
Drinking water reservoirs in England
Lakes of the Lake District
Staveley-in-Cartmel